Thạch Thành is a district (huyện) of Thanh Hóa province in the North Central Coast region of Vietnam.

As of 2019 the district had a population of 143,080. The district covers an area of 567 km². The district capital lies at Kim Tân.

References

Districts of Thanh Hóa province